Islamabad Fashion Week (IFW) is a fashion week annually held in Islamabad, Pakistan. IFW was first held in 2011, run by Triple-E (Pvt.) Ltd. Tariq Amin is the creative head of IFW and Karachi Fashion Week.

2011 
First IFW was held in 2011 at Pak-China Friendship Centre, Islamabad.

2012 
The second Islamabad Fashion Week was held from April 10–12, 2012. Fashion week was held at the Pak-China Friendship Centre.

References

External links 
 
 

Annual events in Pakistan
Fashion events in Pakistan
2011 establishments in Pakistan
Recurring events established in 2011
Fashion weeks